Languedoc-Roussillon is a former administrative region of France. On 1 January 2016, it joined with the region of Midi-Pyrénées to become Occitania. It comprised five departments, and bordered the other French regions of Provence-Alpes-Côte d'Azur, Rhône-Alpes, Auvergne, Midi-Pyrénées towards the north, and Spain, Andorra and the Mediterranean Sea towards the south. It was the southernmost region of mainland France.

Toponymy
The first part of the name of the province of Languedoc-Roussillon comes from the French  ("language of "), and is also a historical region. In southern France, the word for yes was the Occitan language word . These old place names referred to the areas where Occitan and Old French were spoken. The Edict of Villers-Cotterets made French the official national language in 1539. Roussillon was the name of the medieval County of Roussillon.

History 

Their capitals were Toulouse and Nîmes.

They made a pact with the Romans from the 1st century BC. Narbonne was created to pacify the province in 118 BC and became the capital of the Narbonnaise.

At the beginning of the 5th century, the Vandals invaded the province and then the Visigoths settled there. The Narbonne region, like the Iberian Peninsula, remained Visigothic until its conquest by the Moors between 719 and 725 (fall of Carcassonne and Nîmes).

The region was conquered by Pépin the Short (fall of Narbonne in 759), who made it the marquisate of Gothia, included in the kingdom of Aquitaine created in 778. This vast territory encompassed all of the south of the Rhône to the Atlantic and was bequeathed by Charlemagne to his son Louis the Pious in 781. The administration was entrusted to the counts of Toulouse.

During the feudal era, a great political fragmentation took place: the counties of Roussillon and Cerdanya passed into the orbit of the kingdom of Aragon, while Bas-Languedoc passed under the domination of the house of Trencavel and their rivals the counts of Toulouse.

Raymond IV (1042-1115) achieved through marriage the objective of reunification by enlarging his state to the county of Rouergue, Nîmes, Narbonne, Gévaudan, Agde, Béziers and Uzès.

The fight against Catharism and the Albigensian Crusade led to the extinction of the dynasty of the Counts of Toulouse. The province was united to the Kingdom of France in 1271, with the exception of Montpellier, which remained under the influence of the House of Barcelona and then of Majorca, and which was not attached to the Kingdom of France until 1349. From there was born the royal Languedoc which persisted until the French Revolution.

The Treaty of Corbeil in 1258 ratified the division with the southern territories of the region. The Corbières formed the border between the kingdom of France and the kingdom of Aragon.

In 1659, the Treaty of the Pyrenees led to the annexation of Roussillon and northern Cerdanya to the kingdom of France.

Population 
The region is experiencing the strongest demographic growth in France, and could have around 3,300,000 inhabitants in 2030, an increase of 36% compared to 2000. This increase is mainly due to internal migration, natural increase being rather low.

Pyrénées-Orientales has the largest proportion of elderly people (12.10% over 75). Gard and Hérault are the "youngest" departments, but they are destined to "age" considerably in the coming years. By 2020, the number of people aged over 75 is expected to increase by 12% across the region.

Religion 
Catholicism is the most represented religion in the region, particularly at the level of historical monuments and associations. The Ecclesiastical Province of Montpellier corresponds to the administrative region. The region has 16 cathedrals (Agde, Alès, Alet, Béziers, Carcassonne, Elne, Lodève, Maguelone, Mende, Montpellier, Narbonne, Nîmes, Perpignan, Saint-Papoul, Saint-Pons-de-Thomières, Uzès).

Protestantism is well represented in the region, especially in the Huguenot stronghold of the Cévennes. The Cévennes-Languedoc-Roussillon region of the United Protestant Church includes Gard, Lozère, Hérault, Aude, Pyrénées-Orientales as well as the eastern part of Aveyron. It is an important region by its Protestant population (approximately 20,000 homes), but one of the least extensive of the United Protestant Church of France. In addition to this majority church, the region has since the 19th century a variety of Free, Reformed Evangelical, Baptist, Methodist and Pentecostal churches.

Judaism has been present since the Middle Ages with significant communities fleeing the Almohads, in Narbonne and Béziers. The Jews are thus cited in the will of William V of Montpellier. Islam is also present at the same time.

Catharism appeared in the region in the middle of the 12th century, in Aude.

Geography 

The region is made up of the following historical provinces:

 68.7% of Languedoc-Roussillon was formerly part the province of Languedoc: the departments of Hérault, Gard, Aude, the extreme south and extreme east of Lozère, and the extreme north of Pyrénées-Orientales. The former province of Languedoc also extends over what is now the Midi-Pyrénées region, including the old capital of Languedoc Toulouse.
 17.9% of Languedoc-Roussillon was formerly the province of Gévaudan, now the department of Lozère. A small part of the former Gévaudan lies inside the current Auvergne region. Gévaudan is often considered to be a sub-province inside the province of Languedoc, in which case Languedoc would account for 86.6% of Languedoc-Roussillon.
 13.4% of Languedoc-Roussillon, located in the southernmost part of the region, is a collection of five historical Catalan , from east to west: Roussillon, Vallespir, Conflent, Capcir, and Cerdagne, all of which are now part of the department of Pyrénées-Orientales. These pays were part of the Ancien Régime province of Roussillon, owning its name to the largest and most populous of the five pays, Roussillon. "Province of Roussillon and adjacent lands of Cerdagne" was indeed the name that was officially used after the area became French in 1659, based on the historical division of the five pays between the county of Roussillon (Roussillon and Vallespir) and the county of Cerdagne (Cerdagne, Capcir, and Conflent).

Llívia is a town of Cerdanya, province of Girona, Catalonia, Spain, that forms a Spanish exclave surrounded by French territory (department of Pyrénées-Orientales).

Politics

At the regional elections in March 2004, the socialist mayor of Montpellier Georges Frêche, defeated its center-right president. Since then, Georges Frêche has embarked on a complete overhaul of the region and its institutions. The flag of the region, which displayed the cross of Languedoc as well as the Flag of Roussillon (the ), was changed for a new flag with no reference to the old provinces, except in terms of the colors (red and yellow), which are the colors of both Languedoc and all the territories from the former Crown of Aragon.

Georges Frêche also wanted to change the name of the region, wishing to erase its duality (Languedoc vs. Roussillon) and strengthen its unity. Thus, he wanted to rename the region Septimanie (Septimania).  was the name created by the Romans at the end of the Roman Empire for the coastal area corresponding quite well to present day Languedoc-Roussillon (including Roussillon, but not including Gévaudan), and used in the early Middle Ages for the area. This name, however, has not been in use since the 9th century, and it sounded quite odd to French people.
Strong opposition of the population led to Georges Frêche giving up on his idea. He declared that he still believed in it but could not go ahead without a mandate.

This idea has minimal popular support.

On the other hand, there are some who would like to merge the Languedoc-Roussillon and Midi-Pyrénées regions, thus reunifying the old province of Languedoc, and creating a large region. It seems probable that Georges Frêche, with his idea of a "Septimanie" region, would not support such plans, although political leaders in Béziers, Narbonne, and especially Nîmes, would probably support such a merger, hostile as they are to Montpellier, which was chosen as the capital of Languedoc-Roussillon instead of their own city, and which they accuse of hegemony.

Culture

Language
Prior to the 20th century, Occitan was the language spoken in Languedoc, and Catalan was the language spoken in Roussillon. Both have been under pressure from French. In 2004, research conducted by the Government of Catalonia showed that 65% of adults over the age of 15 in Roussillon could understand Catalan whereas 37% stated they were able to speak it.

In recent years there have been attempts at reviving of both languages, including Catalan-medium schooling through the La Bressola schools.

Literature
Occitan literature – still sometimes called Provençal literature – is a body of texts written in Occitan in what is nowadays the South of France. It originated in the poetry of the eleventh- and twelfth-century troubadours, and inspired the rise of vernacular literature throughout medieval Europe.

Music
Aimeric de Peguilhan, Giraut de Bornelh and Bertran de Born were major influences in troubadour composition, in the High Middle Ages. The troubadour tradition is considered to have originated in the region.

The Romantic music composer Déodat de Séverac was born in the region, and, following his schooling in Paris, returned to the region to compose. He sought to incorporate the music indigenous to the area in his compositions.

Wine

Grapevines are said to have existed in the South of France since the Pliocene period - before the existence of Homo sapiens. The first vineyards of Gaul developed around two towns: Béziers and Narbonne. The Mediterranean climate and plentiful land with soil ranging from rocky sand to thick clay was very suitable for the production of wine, and it is estimated that one in ten bottles of the world's wine was produced in this region during the 20th century (Robinson 1999:395). Despite this enormous quantity, the area's significance was often overlooked by scholarly publications and commercial journals, largely because very little of the wine being produced was classified under an appellation contrôlée until the 1980s (Joseph 2005:190).

Several entrepreneurs such as Robert Skalli and James Herrick drastically changed the face of the region, planting more commercially viable grape varieties and pushing for new AOC classifications.  While the AOC system has origins in the 15th century, the Languedoc-Roussillon has some appellations like the Cabardès which have existed by law only since 1999 (Joseph 2005:190).

The region is the largest contributor to the European Union's glut (dominance of supply over demand) of wine known as the wine lake.

The Languedoc-Roussillon region has adopted a marque to help market its products, in particular, but not limited to, wine. The  (Southern France) marque was adopted in 2006 to help customers abroad not familiar with the Appellation system to recognise those wines that originated in the L-R area, but the marque is also used for other products, including cheeses, olive oils and pies.

Sport
Languedoc-Roussillon has been a major center of Rugby league in France since the sport was introduced to the country in the 1930s. The region is also home to the rugby union teams AS Béziers Hérault, RC Narbonne and USA Perpignan. Since the following years of the retirement of this region, the popularity has gone down.

Montpellier is home to Montpellier HSC, which was founded in 1974 and plays in the Ligue 1, the French top division. It won the French Championship after the 2011/12 season. Home matches are played at the Stade La Mosson, named after the area where it is located, with a capacity of 31,250. It was built in 1998.

Notable people

Writers 

 Paul Valéry (1871-1945) writer, philosopher, poet and epistemologist.
 Claude Simon (1913-2005), writer, born in Madagascar, was brought up in Perpignan and throughout his life showed a real attachment to the Catalan land. He spent part of his last years in his home in Salses-le-Château.
 Malika Mokeddem, born in Algeria in 1949, she continued her medical doctorate, begun in Oran, in Paris in 1977. Based in Montpellier, she is the author of L'interdite and Je owe tout à ton oublie. Her works are inspired by her personal journey.
 Max Roqueta (1908-2005) poet and writer in Occitan. He created the French Tambourine Federation.
 Joseph Delteil (1894-1978) poet and writer; he was the friend of Georges Brassens and Pierre Soulages.
 Jean Joubert (1928-2015), poet and writer for both youth and adults, wrote Arche de la parole and Le chien qui savait lire. He received the Prix Renaudot in 1975 for L'Homme de sable.
 Alphonse Daudet (1840-1897), writer and playwright, born in Nîmes and grew up in Bezouce.
 Robèrt Lafont (1923-2009), poet and writer in Occitan, essayist, linguist

Illustrators 

 Albert Dubout (1905-1976) studied at the School of Fine Arts in Montpellier and became the illustrator of many national newspapers, then the poster designer and designer. He very often parodied the little train linking Montpellier to Palavas-les-Flots where a museum is dedicated to him.

Singers 

 Georges Brassens, born in Sète
 Charles Trenet, born in Narbonne
 Patric, Occitan singer
 Olivia Ruiz, born in Carcassonne
 Cali, originally from Vernet-les-Bains
 Boby Lapointe, born in Pézenas
 Julien Doré, born in Alès
 , singer-songwriter

Comedians 

 Rémi Gaillard
 Mathieu Madénian

Major communities

 Alès
 Béziers
 Carcassonne
 La Palme
 Montpellier
 Narbonne
 Nîmes
 Perpignan
 Sète

See also
 Languedoc wine
 List of appellations in Languedoc-Roussillon
 List of châteaux in Languedoc-Roussillon

References

 
 Official Béziers Tourist Office Website

External links

 Languedoc-Rousillon : Languedoc: a week in which you get to play the action hero official French website (in English)
 Regional Council of Languedoc-Roussillon (in French)

 
Languedoc-Roussillon wine AOCs
NUTS 2 statistical regions of the European Union
Former regions of France
France geography articles needing translation from French Wikipedia